Draco quinquefasciatus, the five-lined flying dragon or five-banded gliding lizard, is a species of agamid lizard. It is found in Thailand, Indonesia, and Malaysia.

References

Draco (genus)
Reptiles of Thailand
Reptiles of Indonesia
Reptiles of Malaysia
Reptiles described in 1827
Taxa named by Thomas Hardwicke
Taxa named by John Edward Gray
Reptiles of Borneo